This is a list of dubstep musicians. This includes artists who have either been very important to the genre or have had a considerable amount of exposure (such as those that have been on a major label). This list does not include little-known local artists. Artists are listed by the first letter in their name (not including the words "a", "an", or "the").

List

0-9
 12th Planet
 16 Bit
 2562

A
 Ace Aura
 Adventure Club
 Alvin Risk
 Au5

B
 Bassnectar
 Bear Grillz
 Benga
 Black Tiger Sex Machine
 James Blake
 Blackmill
 Borgore
 Boxcutter
 Breakage
 Bro Safari 
 Burial

C
 Caspa
 Chase & Status
 Alex Clare
 Clubroot
 Crankdat
 Crizzly

D
 Datsik
 Delta Heavy
 Digital Mystikz
 Dillon Francis
 Dirtyphonics
 Distance
 DJ Chef
 DJ Fresh
 DJ SFR
 Doctor P
 Dog Blood
 Drop the Lime

E
 El-B
 Emalkay
 Ephixa
 Eptic
 Excision

F
 Figure
 Flux Pavilion
 Foreign Beggars
 Fox Stevenson
 FS
 FuntCase

G
 Gammer
 The Gaslamp Killer
 Geiom
 Gemini
 Getter
 Ghastly
 Jon Gooch
 Goth-Trad

H
 Mick Harris
 Hatcha
 Haywyre
 Herobust
 Horsepower Productions

I
 Ikonika
 ILLENIUM
 Ill-esha
 Infected Mushroom

J
 Jack Beats
 Jakwob
 James Blake
 Jauz
 JDevil
 Joker
 Joy Orbison
 Juakali

K
 Kahn
 Katy B
 Kayzo
 KDrew
 Killbot
 Kill the Noise
 Klaypex
 Knife Party
 KOAN Sound
 Kode9
 Kompany
 Krewella
 Kromestar
 Kuuro

L
 Labrinth
 Lindsey Stirling
 Liquid Stranger
 Loefah

M
 The M Machine
 Magnetic Man
 Kevin Martin
 Martyn
 Modestep
 Moore Kismet
 Mount Kimbie
 Mr FijiWiji
 MRK1
 Mt Eden
 Muzz

N
 Navene-k
 Nero
 NGHTMRE
 Noisestorm
 Joe Nice
 Noisia

O
 Omar LinX

P
 Panda Eyes
 Pegboard Nerds
 Pinch
 Plastician
 Porter Robinson

R
 Reid Speed
 REZZ
 Riot Ten
 Rusko

S
 Savant
 SBTRKT
 Scuba
 Seven Lions
 ShockOne
 Ivan Shopov
 Silkie
 Skream
 Skrillex
 SLANDER
 Slushii
 SNAILS
 Steve Aoki
 Sub Focus
 Subtronics
 Sullivan King
 SVDDEN DEATH

T
 Terravita
 Truth

U
 Unicorn Kid

V
 Vaccine
 Various
 Vex'd
 Virtual Riot

W
 Watch The Duck
 Wooli
 Jamie Woon

Z
 Zedd
 Zed Bias
 Zeds Dead
 Zomby
 Zomboy

See Also
Lists of musicians

References

Dubstep